Major General Sir John Charles Oakes Marriott,  (29 June 1895 – 11 September 1978) was a senior British Army officer who served during the First World War and again in the Second World War.

Military career
John Marriott was born in Stowmarket, Suffolk, on 29 June 1895. He was educated at Repton School and later entered the Royal Military College, Sandhurst, from where he graduated and was commissioned as a second lieutenant into the Northamptonshire Regiment in 1914, the year the First World War began. Promoted to lieutenant on 10 May 1915, he served in the war as a Staff Captain with the 7th Infantry Brigade in France and then as a General Staff Officer (GSO) with the 66th (2nd East Lancashire) Division. Marriott won both the Distinguished Service Order (DSO) and Military Cross, as well as the French Croix de guerre.

He remained in the army after the war and during the interwar period and became a GSO to the military attaché in Washington, D.C. He transferred to the Scots Guards in 1920. He was made Deputy Assistant Adjutant & Quartermaster General for London District in 1933. Appointed a Member of the Royal Victorian Order in 1935 and elevated to Commander in 1937, Marriott was made Commanding Officer (CO) of the 2nd Battalion, Scots Guards in 1938.

He served in the Second World War, initially in the Middle East and from 1940 as CO of the 21st Infantry Brigade. From October 1940 he commanded the 29th Indian Infantry Brigade, part of the 5th Indian Infantry Division, in the East African Campaign for which he received a Bar to his DSO. In October 1941, on return to the Western Desert, he was placed in command of the 22nd Guards Brigade, which was renamed successively 200th Guards Brigade and 201st Guards Motor Brigade. He avoided capture when the brigade was forced to surrender when Tobruk was captured during the Battle of Gazala on 20 June 1942 by German and Italian forces. He returned to the United Kingdom and from September 1942 to December 1943 he took command of the 32nd Guards Brigade, part of the Guards Armoured Division. He was Deputy Director of Infantry at the War Office from 1943.

After the war he was promoted to acting major-general on 15 October 1945 and became General Officer Commanding (GOC) of the Guards Division in Germany in 1945 and Major-General commanding the Brigade of Guards and GOC London District in 1947; he retired from the army in 1950.

Family

In 1920 he married Maud (Momo) Emily Wolff Kahn (1897-1960), the daughter of Otto Hermann Kahn, investment banker, collector, philanthropist, and patron of the arts. They had one child, John Oakes Marriott (1921-2007) who never married. The three are buried together in Brookwood Cemetery in Surrey.

References

Publications

Bibliography

External links
National Portrait Gallery, London Photographs Collection:  Sir John Charles Oakes Marriott portrait photograph by Walter Stoneman, 27 May 1947.
Generals of World War II

|-
 

1895 births
1978 deaths
British Army personnel of World War I
Companions of the Distinguished Service Order
Companions of the Order of the Bath
Knights Commander of the Royal Victorian Order
Northamptonshire Regiment officers
Scots Guards officers
Recipients of the Croix de Guerre 1914–1918 (France)
Recipients of the Military Cross
Burials at Brookwood Cemetery
British military attachés
British Army generals
Military personnel from Suffolk
War Office personnel in World War II
Graduates of the Royal Military College, Sandhurst
British Army brigadiers of World War II
People educated at Repton School